Who? is a science fiction novel by American writer Algis Budrys, set during the Cold War. The novel was first published in 1958.

It was adapted into a 1974 film of the same name starring Elliott Gould.

Plot

An explosion resulting from an experiment gone awry rocks an Allied research facility near the border with the Soviet Bloc. A Soviet team abducts Lucas Martino, a leading Allied physicist in charge of a secret, high-priority project called K-88.

Several months later, under American pressure, the Soviet officials finally hand over an individual, claiming that he is Martino. The man has undergone extensive surgery for his injuries. He has a mechanical arm that is more advanced than any produced in the West. More importantly, his head is now a nearly featureless metal skull, a kind of extreme craniofacial prosthesis. A medical evaluation reveals that several of the man's internal organs are also artificial. His biological arm and its hand's fingerprints are identified as Martino's, but this may be the result of an arm and hand transplantation. The Allies are suspicious that the Soviets have sent them a technologically altered spy and are holding the real Martino for further interrogation.

The struggle to determine the man's true identity is the novel's central conflict. In the end, Shawn Rogers, the agent given the task, is unable to reach a conclusion. The man is released, but kept under surveillance and barred from working on physics projects. Later, when progress bogs down on the K-88 project, Rogers is sent to ask him to come back to work. The man refuses to go, and when finally asked directly if he is Lucas Martino, says simply "No": a reply that will later be seen as trenchantly mordant.

Budrys tells the story in alternating chapters.  Every second chapter relates part of Lucas Martino's life, highlighting his family, his struggle to support a career in physics, and his dalliances in romance. The young man spent his formative years in an Italian American New Jersey farm community (with English as his second language), then works his way through the City College of New York, and graduate studies at the Massachusetts Institute of Technology.

The last part of the novel tells what happened on the Soviet side. It takes many weeks for doctors to save Martino's life. Soviet interrogator Anastas Azarin has little time to work with and is thrown off by the prisoner's expressionless appearance. An attempt was actually made to replace Martino with a Soviet agent (his former MIT roommate, who knows him well enough to take on the role), and who was to disappear in a staged air crash, but this fails.

Thus, at the end of the book the mystery is resolved to the reader's satisfaction: the man is indeed Lucas Martino, not a Soviet agent, and he is perfectly willing to resume his scientific work. But since the Western authorities cannot be sure of that, he will never be allowed near sensitive material again; rather, he is doomed to live out the rest of his life as an obscure farmer, under a shadow of suspicion that he will never be able to dispel. The treatment he received on his return, the endless suspicion and hostility, transformed him: he is indeed no longer the Lucas Martino he was before the accident, hence the mordant quality of his final reply to Rogers.

As made evident by one of the titles of the film adaptation, The Man in the Steel Mask, the book is loosely inspired by the historical mystery of the Man in the Iron Mask in the 18th century.

Characters 
Lucas Martino, a kidnapped physicist
Shawn Rogers, the Allied intelligence agent assigned to determine the identity of the released man
Anastas Azarin, the Soviet agent who interrogates Martino

Film adaptation
The novel was adapted into a 1974 film of the same name directed by Jack Gold and starring Elliott Gould, Trevor Howard, and Joseph Bova.

Sources

References

External links

http://www.trashfiction.co.uk/who.html

1958 American novels
American novels adapted into films
1958 science fiction novels
American science fiction novels
Novels set during the Cold War
Fictional cyborgs
Novels republished in the Library of America
Science fiction novels adapted into films
Pyramid Books books